The 1938 FIFA World Cup final was the third edition of the football quadrennial tournament match contested by the men's national teams of FIFA to determine the 1938 FIFA World Cup champions: Italy and Hungary. Italy defended its claim to the championship 4–2 in the last tournament before World War II.

The final match took place at the Stade Olympique de Colombes in Paris. Vittorio Pozzo's Italian side took the lead early, but Hungary equalised within two minutes. The Italians shortly regained the lead, and by the end of the first half were leading the Hungarians 3–1. At 4–2, Italy successfully defended its title, the inaugural team to win on foreign soil.

The last survivor of the game was Italy's Pietro Rava, who died on 5 November 2006 at the age of 90.

Route to the final

Match

Summary
After six minutes, Gino Colaussi opened the scoring for Italy; Pál Titkos equalised for Hungary two minutes later, but with just over a quarter of an hour played, Italy regained the lead with a goal from Silvio Piola. Ten minutes before half-time, Italy extended their lead to 3–1 after the unmarked Colaussi scored his second goal. Midway through the second half, Hungary captain György Sárosi got his side back to within a goal of the Italians, but with eight minutes to go, Piola scored his second goal to complete a 4–2 win for Italy.

Details

References

External links
1938 FIFA World Cup Final at Planet World Cup

FIFA World Cup finals
1938 FIFA World Cup
Hungary national football team matches
Italy national football team matches
Italy at the 1938 FIFA World Cup
Hungary at the 1938 FIFA World Cup
International association football competitions hosted by Paris
1938 in Paris
June 1938 sports events
Hungary–Italy relations